Judeichthys is an extinct genus of prehistoric ray-finned fish that lived during the lower Cenomanian. There is one currently known species, Judeichthys haasi, which was found near Ramallah in Palestine.

See also

 Prehistoric fish
 List of prehistoric bony fish

References

Late Cretaceous fish
Gonorynchidae
Late Cretaceous fish of Asia
Prehistoric ray-finned fish genera